Erik Hjelm (22 May 1893 – 30 June 1975) was a Swedish footballer. He played in 19 matches for the Sweden national football team from 1913 to 1923. He was also part of Sweden's squad for the football tournament at the 1920 Summer Olympics, but he did not play in any matches.

References

External links
 

1893 births
1975 deaths
Swedish footballers
Sweden international footballers
Association football forwards
IFK Göteborg players
People from Alingsås